Bon Cop, Bad Cop is a 2006 Canadian dark comedy-thriller buddy cop film about two police officers – one Ontarian and one Québécois – who reluctantly join forces to solve a murder. The dialogue is a mixture of English and French. The title is a translation word play on the phrase "Good cop/bad cop".

A sequel, Bon Cop, Bad Cop 2, was filmed in 2016 and released in May 2017.

Plot
When a body is found hanging on top of the sign demarcating the Ontario-Quebec border, police officers from both Canadian provinces must join forces to solve the murder. David Bouchard is a rule-bending, francophone detective for the Sûreté du Québec, while Martin Ward is a by-the-book anglophone Ontario Provincial Police detective. The bilingual detectives must resolve their professional and cultural differences as well as their bigotry and prejudices.

The body is identified as Benoit Brisset, a hockey executive. The clues lead the pair to Luc Therrien at a roadside bar. After a fight in the bar, they imprison him in the trunk of Bouchard's car. Bouchard has promised to watch his daughter's ballet recital, so he drives to the recital and parks the car in front with Therrien still locked in the trunk. When they emerge, they find the car being towed from the no-parking zone, and as they try to chase down the truck driver, the car explodes.

With their prime witness dead, they decide to search Therrien's house where they find a large marijuana grow-op in the basement. They also discover another body, a former hockey team owner. A laser tripwire is activated by Bouchard, which sets the house on fire, destroying the house and causing the two cops to get high on the fumes of the burning marijuana. When they are disciplined by Bouchard's police chief shortly afterwards, he angrily removes them from the case after they start laughing hysterically because they're still high.

The next victim is discovered in Toronto. They realize that the killer has a pattern of tattooing his victims, with each tattoo providing a clue to the next murder victim. Each murder is in some way connected to major league hockey. (The film uses thinly disguised parodies of National Hockey League teams, owners and players, however, rather than the real league). The pair anticipate the next victim, but he goes missing before they reach him. Ward and Bouchard appear on a hockey broadcast to warn people in the hockey community to be vigilant. The "Tattoo Killer" calls in to the show and threatens the two police officers, causing a brawl between them and the anchor when they attempt to hang up.

Ward is attacked in his home by a masked assailant whom he discovers is Therrien. Meanwhile, Bouchard has sex with Ward's sister.

The "Tattoo Killer" kidnaps Bouchard's daughter, leading to the final confrontation with the two policemen. It is ultimately revealed that the murders are being committed by a bilingual portly hockey fan, as previously mentioned, under the direction and unequal partnership of a sadistic, psychopathic, sociopathic, fan of the notion of the game of hockey as a Canadian nationalistic symbol that he feels is being permanently corrupted by attempts to move ownership of Canadian teams to venture capitalist groups in the United States.  He is therefore having Therrien commit the murders along with him (with the tattoos as a signature), as revenge against the hockey league for desecrating the game by moving Canadian teams such as the "Quebec Fleur de Lys" (a reference to the now-defunct Quebec Nordiques) to the United States. They try to reason with him that hockey is just a game and exchange Therrien who the detectives intercepted tailing them at a conference, for Bouchard's daughter, but this only angers him. The Tattoo Killer executes Therrien, Ward distracts the man while Bouchard unties his daughter.  After a fight, the killer is blown up by one of his own explosives.  During the credits, a news report is shown, revealing that the hockey teams will not be moved.

Cast

Bilingualism
Bon Cop, Bad Cop claimed to be Canada's first bilingual feature film, although that accomplishment in fact belongs to Amanita Pestilens (1963). Since the film revolves around the concept of mixed cultures and languages, most scenes include a mixture of French and English dialogue, with characters switching language rapidly. The entire movie was filmed using both a French and an English script, and the language used at each moment was finalized only later, during editing. The film was then released in two official versions, one for Anglophones and one for Francophones, which differ only in their subtitles and in a few spoken lines. On DVD, the film has multiple subtitle options, including every line in either English, in French, or in their respective languages; just the French lines in English (as released theatrically in English-speaking Canada) and vice versa (as released theatrically in French-speaking Canada); and an option for no subtitles for bilingual viewers.

Exhibition and box office

Canada
The film opened in Quebec on August 4, 2006 (and Canada-wide on August 18), and, as of December 17, 2006, had grossed $12,665,721 US ($12,578,327 CAD), making it one of the highest-grossing Canadian films of all time domestically. While the film has generated only $1.3 million outside of Quebec, its success is significant given the difficulties that Canadian films normally face at the box office in English Canada.

In October 2006, Bon Cop, Bad Cop producers claimed that the film had become the highest-grossing Canadian film domestically, surpassing the $11.2 million teen comedy Porky's earned in Canada in 1981. However, the numbers were later disputed as not having taken inflation into account.

The film was released on DVD in Canada on December 19, 2006.

International
The film has not been released theatrically outside Canada, although it has been screened at film festivals and other occasions in the United States and France.

Awards and recognition

The film won in two of its ten nominated categories for the 27th Genie Awards in 2007:
 Best motion picture
 Overall sound

Its other nominated categories were:
 Best actor: Colm Feore
 Best actor: Patrick Huard
 Direction: Érik Canuel
 Art Direction/Production Design: Jean Bécotte
 Cinematography: Bruce Chun
 Editing: Jean-François Bergeron
 Sound editing
 Original song: "Tattoo", Éric Lapointe

The film was also nominated for four Canadian Comedy Awards in 2007, winning three:
 Best Direction
 Best Writing
 Best Actor (Colm Feore)

Its other nominated category was:
 Best Actor (Patrick Huard)

The film also won the 'billet d'or' (golden ticket) at Quebec's 2007 Jutra Awards.  This award is given to the film with the highest box-office success.

References

External links
Northern Stars: Bon Cop, Bad Cop, accessed July 25, 2006
 cinoche.com: Bon cop, bad cop, accessed July 25, 2006
PulpMovies: Bon Cop, Bad Cop, accessed July 25, 2006
 
 
 

2006 films
English-language Canadian films
2006 action films
Canadian action films
Canadian crime comedy films
Buddy comedy films
2000s buddy cop films
Canadian ice hockey films
Best Picture Genie and Canadian Screen Award winners
Films set in Montreal
Films shot in Montreal
Films shot in Ottawa
Films directed by Érik Canuel
Films set in Toronto
Bilingualism in Canada
Alliance Atlantis films
Canadian multilingual films
French-language Canadian films
2000s Canadian films